Sceloporus occidentalis longipes is a subspecies of the western fence lizard, commonly called the Great Basin fence lizard. Several subspecies of the western fence lizard, a species of phrynosomatid lizard, are found in the far western part of North America.

Gallery

See also
 Coast Range fence lizard
 Island fence lizard
 Northwestern fence lizard

Notes

References
 Hobart M. Smith (1995) Handbook of Lizards: Lizards of the United States and of Canada, Cornell University Press, 557 pages 
 C. Michael Hogan (2008) "Western fence lizard (Sceloporus occidentalis)", Globaltwitcher, ed. Nicklas Stromberg 

Sceloporus
Fauna of the Great Basin